was a Japanese film actor. In 1942, Yamagata and So Yamamura formed the Bunkaza Theatre Company.  In 1949 he made his film debut with Kirareya Senta. Yamagata became famous for his role in 1953 film Gate of Hell. He became a character actor and often played villainous roles. In 1973, Yamagata landed main role on the TV jidaigeki Kenkaku Shōbai. 

He died of tuberculosis in 1996. He appeared in more than 180 films between 1951 and 1984.

Selected filmography

 Bungawan soro (1951)
 Ringo-en no shōjo (1952)
 Mukokuseki-sha (1952)
 Sen-hime (1953) - Samanosuke Itsumi
 Pu-san (1953)
 Kimi ni sasageshi inochi nariseba (1953)
 Seishun Zenigata Heiji (1953) - Plibp
 Gate of Hell (1953) - Wataru Watanabe
 Higeki no shôgun: Yamashita Tomoyuki (1953)
 Hana to ryû - Dai-ichi-bu: Dôkai-wan no rantô (1954) - Shin'nosuke Mori
 Seven Samurai (1954) - Samurai #1
 Wakaki hi no takuboku: Kumo wa tensai de aru (1954) - Kanematsu Kikuchi
 Kakute yume ari (1954) - Ichirô Kasuga
 Jigoku no kengô Hirate Miki (1954) - Isonoshin Yamabe
 The Princess Sen (1954) - Dewanokami Sakasaki
 Floating Clouds (1955) - Sugio Iba
 Minan o koshô: Hitokiri hikosei (1955)
 Jokyû (1955) - Ryûjin Aramaki
 Juku no hana yome (1955)
 Princess Yang Kwei-Fei (1955) - Yang Hsien
 Uruwashiki saigetsu (1955)
 Rokunin no ansatsusha (1955) - Kondō Isami
 Asakusa no oni (1955)
 Meoto zenzai (1955)
 Kôdôkan shitennô (1955)
 Tarao Bannai senritsu no nanakamen (1956)
 Bara no kôdôkan (1956) - Shogoro Yabe
 Warning from Space (1956) - Dr. Matsuda
 Denkô ryûsei karate uchi (1956)
 Neko to Shôzô to futari no onna (1956)
 Tsukigata Hanpeita: Hana no maki; Arashi no maki (1956) - Fujioka
 Shinshokoku monogatari: Nanatsu no chikai kurosuisen no maki (1956)
 Yôda no maden (1956) - Danjô Sarashina
 Outlaw: List of Dupes (1956)
 The Swamp (1956) - Buri-daijin
 Shinshokoku monogatari: Nanatsu no chikai doreisen no maki (1957)
 Shinshokoku monogatari: Nanatsu no chikai gaisen uta no maki (1957)
 The Rice People (1957) - Matsunosuke Ota
 Ôsaka monogatari (1957)
 Ujô (1957) - Shinpei Nakayama
 Tajobushin (1957)
 Daibosatsu tôge (1957) - Lord kamio
 Yûreisen: Zempen (1957) - Gemba Akahana
 Yûreisen: Kôhen (1957) - Yamizô
 Onna goroshi abura jigoku (1957)
 Kichigai buraku (1957)
 Jigokû misaki no fukushû (1957)
 Fuji ni tatsu kage (1957)
 Edo no meibutsuotoko: Isshin Tasuke (1958) - Matsudaira-Izunokami
 Daibosatsu tôge - Dai ni bu (1958)
 Seven from Edo (1958) - Tatewaki
 Uguisu-jô no hanayome (1958)
 Isshin Tasuke - Tenka no ichidaiji (1958) - Matsudaira-Izunokami
 Ten to sen (1958) - Tatsuo Yasuda
 Nora neko (1958)
 Onmitsu Shichishoki (1958)
 Ninkyo Tokaido (1958) - Kadoi
 Do no hâjiki wa jigokû dazê (1958)
 Binan-jo (1959)
 Shingo juban-shobu (1959)
 Kitsune to tanuki (1959)
 Daibosatsu tôge - Kanketsu-hen (1959)
 Shingo jûban shôbu: dai-ni-bu (1959)
 Tenka no igagoe: akatsuki no kessen (1959)
 Chiyari musô (1959)
 Isshin Tasuke: Otoko no naka no otoko ippiki (1959)
 Edo no akutaro (1959) - Tenzen Akiyama
 Senryô-jishi (1959) - Kainokami Torii
 Jigokû no sokô made tsuki auzê (1959)
 Bored Hatamoto: Acrobats of Death (1959)
 Rônin ichiba - Asayake tengu (1960)
 Shiroi gake (1960)
 Nanatsu no kao no otoko daze (1960)
 Tenpô rokkasen - Jigoku no hanamichi (1960)
 Sake to onna to yari (1960) - Mitsunari Ishida
 Tokai no kaoyaku (1960) - Denbe
 Wakasama Samurai Torimonochoo (1960) - Suzuki Uneme
 Shoretsu shinsengumi - bakumatsu no doran (1960) - Serizawa
 Sabaku o wataru taiyo (1960)
 Nippatsume wa jigoku-iki daze (1960)
 Mito Komon 3: All Star Version (1960)
 Akō Rōshi (1961) - Kataoka Gengoemon
 Zoku shachô dochuki: onna oyabun taiketsu no maki (1961) - President Oyamada
 Uogashi no onna Ishimatsu (1961)
 Tekka daimyo (1961)
 Saigo no kaoyaku (1961)
 Kashi no onna Ishimatsu (1961)
 Hakubajô no hanayome (1961)
 Edokko-hada (1961)
 Beranme Chunori-san (1961)
 Oedo Hyobanji Binan no Kaoyaku (1962) - Soshun
 Mabuta no haha (1962) - Yosuke
 Kisaragi musô ken (1962) - Izuminokami Mizuno
 Ano sura no hate ni hoshi hama tataku (1962)
 Hachi gatsu jûgo-nichi no dôran (1962)
 Yagyû bugeichô: Dokugan itto ryu (1962)
 Sakura hangan (1962)
 Knightly Advice (1962)
 Bored Hatamoto: The Mysterious Cape (1963)
 Yagyû bugeichô: Katame no Jûbei (1963)
 Daidokoro taiheiki (1963)
 Yojinbô ichiba (1963)
 Shin meoto zenzai (1963) - Kyoichi
 Kureji sakusen: Kudabare! Musekinin (1963)
 Yogiri no Joshu-Ji (1963)
 Yagyu Chronicles 7: The Cloud of Disorder (1963)
 Kyôkatsu (1963)
 Hibari Chiemi no Yaji Kita Dochu (1963)
 Miyamoto Musashi: Ichijôji no kettô (1964)
 Jakoman to Tetsu (1964)
 Nijuissai no chichi (1964)
 Surai no gyanburaa (1964)
 Otoko no monsho: hana to nagadosu (1964)
 Kuroi kaikyo (1964) - Senba
 Akai shuriken (1965) - Kanzo
 Una sera di Tokyo (1965) - Shinzô Nakajima
 Radishes and Carrots (1965) - Gohei Suzuka
 Shinobi no mono: Iga-yashiki (1965) - Matsudaira
 A Story Written with Water (1965) - Denzo / Shizuo's father
 Buraikan jingi (1965) - Eitaro Oshika
 Shachô gyôjôki (1966)
 Kigeki ekimae manga (1966)
 Zatoichi's Pilgrimage (1966) - Boss Tohachi
 Kigeki ekimae mangan (1967)
 Kigeki ekimae gakuen (1967)
 Samurai Rebellion (1967) - Shobei Tsuchiya
 Rikugun Nakano gakko: Mitsumei (1967)
 Kigeki ekimae hyakku-nen (1967)
 Aru koroshiya no kagi (1967)
 Hârubiyorî (1967)
 Zansetsu (1968) - Kenichiro Shinjo
 Onna mekura hana to kiba (1968)
 Bakumatsu (1970) - Hiroe Yamada
 Kaoyaku (1971) - Ogata, Seizo
 Lone Wolf and Cub: Sword of Vengeance (1972)
 Lone Wolf and Cub: Baby Cart to Hades (1972) - Sawatari Genba
 Yuki Fujin ezu (1975)
 Fumô chitai (1976)
 Tokugawa ichizoku no houkai (1980) - Itakura Katsukiyo
 The Trout (1982) - Daigo Hamada

TV series
 Hana no Shōgai (1963) - Arimura Jizaemon
 Shiroi Kyotō (1967) - Professor Azuma
 The Water Margin (1973) - Chao Gai
 Kenkaku Shōbai (1973) as Kohei Akiyama
 Karei-naru Ichizoku (1974–75)
 Genroku Taiheiki (1975)
 Dokuganryū Masamune (1987) - Mukaidate Takumi

Honours
Order of the Sacred Treasure, 4th class, Gold Rays with Rosette (1988)

References

External links

1915 births
1996 deaths
Japanese male film actors
Male actors from London
20th-century Japanese male actors